Dee O'Connor was an Irish Gaelic footballer who played as a left corner-back for the Kerry senior team.

References
 Kerry GAA profile
 Dee O'Connor's Kerry record

Kilcummin Gaelic footballers
Kerry inter-county Gaelic footballers
Munster inter-provincial Gaelic footballers
Year of birth missing
Year of death missing